Zygnema is a genus of freshwater filamentous thalloid alga comprising about 100 species. A terrestrial species, Z. terrestre, is known from India. Zygnema grows as a free-floating mass of filaments, although young plants may be found anchored to streambeds with a holdfast. The filaments form a yellow-green to bright green colored tangled mat, and are composed of elongate barrel-shaped cells, each with two star-shaped (stellate) chloroplasts arrayed along the axis of the cell.

Species 

Some species include:
Z. atrocoeruleum
Z. binuclearioides
Z. carinthiacum
Z. carteri
Z. circumcarinatum
Z. coeruleum
Z. conspicuum
Z. cruciatum
Z. cyanosphaeroidicum
Z. cylindricum
Z. cylindrospermum
Z. fanicum
Z. gorakhporense
Z. insigne
Z. kashmirense
Z. kiangsiense
Z. leiospermum
Z. melanosporum
Z. momoniense
Z. normanii
Z. oveidanum
Z. pectinatum
Z. peliosporum
Z. quadrispirale
Z. ralfsii
Z. rivulare
Z. ruviatum
Z. schwabei
Z. spontaneum
Z. stagnale
Z. stellinum
Z. subtile
Z. tenue
Z. tenuissimum
Z. terrestre
Z. vaginatum
Z. vaucherii
Z. verrucosum

References 

Zygnemataceae
Charophyta genera